Kirtana, also rendered as Kirtan, is a Sanskrit word that means "narrating, reciting, telling, describing" of an idea or story, specifically in Indian religions. It also refers to a genre of religious performance arts, connoting a musical form of narration or shared recitation, particularly of spiritual or religious ideas, native to the Indian subcontinent.

With roots in the Vedic anukirtana tradition, a kirtan is a call-and-response style song or chant, set to music, wherein multiple singers recite or describe a legend, or express loving devotion to a deity, or discuss spiritual ideas. It may include dancing or direct expression of bhavas (emotive states) by the singer. Many kirtan performances are structured to engage the audience where they either repeat the chant, or reply to the call of the singer.

A person performing a kirtan is known as a kirtankara (or kirtankar). A Kirtan performance includes an accompaniment of regionally popular musical instruments, such as the harmonium, the veena or ektara (forms of string instruments), the tabla (one-sided drums), the mrdanga or pakhawaj (two-sided drum), flute (forms of woodwind instruments), and karatalas or talas (cymbals). It is a major practice in Hinduism, Vaisnava devotionalism, Sikhism, the Sant traditions and some forms of Buddhism, as well as other religious groups. Kirtan is sometimes accompanied by story-telling and acting. Texts typically cover religious, mythological or social subjects.

Etymology and nomenclature

Kirtana has Vedic roots and it is "telling, narrating, describing, enumerating, reporting". The term is found as Anukirtan (or Anukrti, Anukarana, literally a "re-telling") in the context of Yajna, wherein team recitations of dialogue-style and question-answer riddle hymns were part of the ritual or celebratory dramatic performance. The Sanskrit verses in chapter 13.2 of Shatapatha Brahmana (~800–700 BCE), for example, are written in the form of a riddle play between two actors.

The root of kirtan is kirt. The root is found in the Samhitas, the Brahmanas and other Vedic literature, as well as the Vedanga and Sutras literature. Kirt, according to Monier-Williams contextually means, "to mention, make mention of, tell, name, call, recite, repeat, relate, declare, communicate, commemorate, celebrate, praise, glorify".

Kirtan, sometimes referred to as sankirtana (literally, "collective performance"), is a call-and-response chanting or musical conversation, a genre of religious performance arts that developed during India's bhakti devotional traditions. However, it is a heterogeneous practice that varies regionally according to Christian Novetzke, and includes varying mixture of different musical instruments, dance, oration, theatre, audience participation and moral narration. In Maharashtra for example, states Novetzke, a kirtan  is a call-and-response style performance, ranging from devotional dancing and singing by a lead singer and audience, to an "intricate scholarly treatise, a social commentary or a philosophical/linguistic exposition", that includes narration, allegory, humor, erudition and entertainment – all an aesthetic part of ranga (beauty, color) of the kirtan.

Kirtan is locally known as Abhang, Samaj Gayan, Haveli Sangeet, Vishnupad, Harikatha. The Vaishnava temples and monasteries of Hinduism in Assam and northeastern, called Satra, have a large worship hall named kirtan ghar – a name derived from their being used for congregational singing and performance arts.

Hinduism

Musical recitation of hymns, mantras and the praise of deities has ancient roots in Hinduism, as evidenced by the Samaveda and other Vedic literature.

Kirtanas were popularized by the Bhakti movement of medieval era Hinduism, starting with the South Indian Alvars (Vaishnavism) and Nayanars (Shaivism) around the 6th century, which spread in central, northern, western and eastern India particularly after the 12th century, as a social and congregational response to Hindu-Muslim conflicts. The foundations of the kirtan traditions are also found in other Hindu scriptures such as the Bhagavad-gita where Krishna describes bhakti marga (path of loving devotion to god) as a means to moksha, alongside karma marga (path of action) and jnana marga (path of knowledge). References to kirtan as a musical recitation are also found in the Bhagavata Purana, an important Vaishnava text.

Kirtan is often practiced as a kind of theatrical folk song with call-and-response chanting or antiphon. The ancient sage Narada revered as a musical genius, is called a kirtankar in the Padma Purana. The famous story of Prahlada in the Avatara Katha mentions kirtan as one of nine forms of worship, called the nava vidha bhakti along with shravanam (listening), smaranam (remembrance), pada sevanam (service), archanam (offering), vandanam (obeisance), dasyam (servitude), sakhyam (friendship) and atmanivedanam (surrender). The so-called Naradiya Kirtan divides kirtan into five parts: naman (prayers), purvaranga (spiritual lesson based on old epics), chanting, katha or akhyan (exegesis), and a final prayer for universal welfare.

Vaishnavism

Kirtana as a genre of religious music has been a major part of the Vaishnavism tradition, particularly starting with the Alvars of Sri Vaishnavism sub-tradition between the 7th to 10th century CE. After the 13th-century, two subgenres of kirtan emerged in Vaishnavism, namely the Nama-kirtana wherein the different names or aspects of god (a Vishnu avatar) are extolled, and the Lila- kirtana wherein the deity's life and legends are narrated.

The Marathi Varkari saint Namdev (c. 1270–1350) used the kirtan form of singing to praise the glory of god Vithoba, an avatar of Vishnu. Marathi kirtan is typically performed by one or two main performers, called kirtankar, accompanied by harmonium and tabla. It involves singing, acting, dancing, and story-telling. The Naradiya Kirtan popular in Maharashtra is performed by a single Kirtankar, and contains the poetry of saints of Maharashtra such as Dnyaneshwar, Eknath, Namdev and Tukaram.Learned  poets from 17th and 18th century such as Shridhar, Mahipati, Moropant contributed to the development of this form of kirtan. Jugalbandi Kirtan is performed by two persons, allowing question-answer, dialogue and debate. Performance requires skill in music, dance, comedy, oratory, debate, memory, general knowledge and Sanskrit literature. Training takes place at the Kirtan Kul in Sangli, the Akhil Bharatiya Kirtan Sanstha in Dadar, Mumbai, the Narad Mandir at Sadashiv Peth, Pune and the Kalidas Mahavidyalay in Ramtek, Nagpur as well as at smaller schools in Goa, Beed and Ujjain.

In the early 16th century CE Chaitanya Mahaprabhu popularized adolescent Krishna based san-kirtana in Bengal, with Hare Krishna mantra and other songs, wherein the love between Radha and Krishna was symbolized as the love between one's soul and God.

About the same time, Shankaradeva in Assam inspired the Ekasarana Dharma bhakti movement that emphasized Advaita Vedanta philosophy within the framework of Bhagavata Purana and Vaishnavism. Shankaradeva helped establish Sattras (Hindu temples and monasteries) with kirtan-ghar (also called Namghar), for singing and dramatic performance of Krishna-related theosophy.

In Vrindavan of Braj region, a kirtan accords the Hindustani classical music. The acharya Vallabha launched a kirtan singing devotional movement around the stories of baby Krishna and his early childhood, in early 16th century. "Samaj-Gayan" is the Radha-centered Radha-vallabha Sampradaya's collective style of hymn singing by the Hindustani classical forms "dhrupad" and "dhamar". This genre came to be known as Haveli Sangeet.

Carnatic traditions
In Andhra Pradesh, the compositions of Tallapaka Annamacharya, a 14th-century mystic, represent the earliest known music called sankirtana. He wrote in praise of Lord Venkateswara, the deity of Seven Hills in Tirumala, where unbroken worship has been offered for over twelve centuries at the Tirumala Venkateswara Temple.

Annamcharya is believed to be the incarnation of Lord Venkateswara's sword. During his long and prolific career, he reputedly composed and sang 32,000 Sankirtanas and 12 Shatakas (sets of hundred verses). His works were in Telugu and Sanskrit.

Bhajan versus Kirtan
A Kirtan and a Bhajan are closely related, with both sharing common aims, subjects, musical themes and being devotional performance arts. A Bhajan is more free form, can be singular melody that is performed by a single singer with or without one and more musical instruments. Kirtan, in contrast, differs in being a more structured team performance, typically with a call and response musical structure, similar to an intimate conversation or gentle sharing of ideas, and it includes two or more musical instruments, with roots in the prosody principles of the Vedic era.

Many Kirtan are structured for more audience participation, where the singer calls a spiritual chant, a hymn or a devotional theme such as from Vaishnavism, the audience then responds back by repeating the chant or by chanting back a reply of their shared beliefs.

Sikhism

Kirtan (Gurmukhi: ਕੀਰਤਨ Kīratana) refers to devotional singing in Sikhism. It is typically performed at Gurdwaras (Sikh temples). Sikh scriptures and legends are usually recited in a song, to a certain raga and accompanied with musical instruments. The Gurus themselves created numerous musical instruments including the Taus, the Sarangi, the Saranda and a modification of the Pakhawaj (called Jori) creating an early form of the Tabla.

A Shabad Kirtan refers to the musical recitation of the Guru Granth Sahib, the primary scripture in the Sikhism tradition which is arranged according to raga. The Shabad Kirtan can be listened to silently or sung along with the gathered congregation.

Kirtan in Sikh history has been the musical analog of Kathas recitation, both preferably performed by ragi jatha, or professional trained performers. A Sikh Kirtan is a religious, aesthetic and social event, usually held in a congregational setting on Sundays or over certain festivals to honor the historical Gurus, but major temples in the Sikh tradition recite Kirtan every day as a mark of daily bhakti (devotional remembrance) of God's name. The congregational setting is called a Sangat or Satsang, a word that in ancient Indian texts means "like minded individuals, or fellow travelers on a spiritual journey".

Buddhism
According to Guy Beck, the music tradition did not develop in early Buddhism possibly because it was considered sensual and inconsistent with its core teachings. Later Buddhism did develop monastic chanting of the canonical literature, particularly in the ritualistic Vajrayana and other Mahayana traditions. Chants, songs and plays about the life of the Buddha by the Buddhists of Bengal were called Buddha-samkirtan.

In the west

Paramahansa Yogananda, a Bengali saint was an early proponent of kirtan in the west, chanting Guru Nanak Dev's Hey Hari Sundara ("Oh God Beautiful") with 3,000 people at Carnegie Hall in 1923. Kirtan became more common with the spread of Gaudiya Vaishnavism by the International Society for Krishna Consciousness's (ISKCON) founder A. C. Bhaktivedanta Swami Prabhupada in the 1960s.

Kirtan singers have appeared in the West, such as Krishna Das, Bhagavan Das, Wah! and Jai Uttal as well as Snatam Kaur, Lokah Music, Deva Premal, Jim Gelcer, Jyoshna, Aindra Das, Gina Sala', and Gaura Vani & As Kindred Spirits. Yoga centers report an increase in attendance at kirtan; according to Pure Music’s Frank Goodman in conversation with Krishna Das in 2006, kirtan has taken on a wider popularity.

There are also Kirtan singers in the west who sing authentic traditional Indian style Kirtans such as Kamini Natarajan and Sheela Bringi.

In the United States case law, the term sankirtana has also been used to refer to evangelical activities of ISKCON. ISKCON had sought the right to perform sankirtana in California airports such as in Los Angeles. The court ruled that while ISKCON has a constitutional rights of protected speech, the Los Angeles airport also has a right to forbid any form of solicitation, out of "a legitimate interest in controlling pedestrian congestion and reducing the risk of fraud and duress attendant to repetitive, in-person solicitation of funds" by all groups including ISKCON.

Given name
The male given name Kirtan or Kirtana is used in South India for females as well, particularly in Telangana, Andhra Pradesh, Karnataka, Kerala, and Tamil Nadu.

See also

 Adi Shankara
 Ananda Marga
 Bhakti
 Bhakti movement
 Bhakti yoga
 Bhajan
 Chaitanya Mahaprabhu
 Gaudiya Vaishnavism
 Gurbani
 Hindustani language
 Historical Vedic religion
 Indo-Aryan languages
 International Society for Krishna Consciousness
 Hare Krishna (mantra)
 :Category:Kirtan performers
 Nama sankeerthanam
 Raga
 Sikh music
 Substratum in Vedic Sanskrit
 Vedic Sanskrit
 Vedic chant
 Vedic period

References

External links
The Braj Ras Lila, Darius Swann (1975)
Kirtan’s call-and-response chanting draws a growing number of Washingtonians The Washington Post, Michelle Boorstein (2013)
Kirtan samples: Vaishnavism, Shaivism, Shaktism, Audio files, Shantala Music
ISCON - The Hare Krishna Movement
Sikh Gurbani Kirtan - Exclusive recordings
Sikh Kirtan - Live and recorded
KirtanSongs - Free archive of kirtan sheet music and accompanying audio tracks
Kirtan Ki Hai Raat Baba Aaj Thane Aano Hai - Beautiful Bhajan Kirtan Ki Hai Raat Baba Aaj Thane Aano Hai Lyrics

 
Hindu prayer and meditation
Bhakti movement
 
Indian folk music
Indian feminine given names
Hindu music
Performing arts in India
Puja (Hinduism)
Music of Bengal
Indian styles of music